Mario Fernando Peña Angulo (19 May 1952 – 25 August 2008) was a Peruvian politician and a Congressman representing Loreto from 2006 until his death 2008. Peña belonged to the Centre Front and the Popular Action party. He has been replaced by Jorge Foinquinos.

Biography 
In 2001, President Valentín Paniagua designated him executive president of the Transitory Council of Regional Administration of Loreto (CTAR-Loreto). In the 2006 elections, he was elected congressman representing Loreto as a member of the Centre Front.

Member of various parliamentary commissions, it is recognized by the dedication of it especially in favor of bills by promoting the development of the Peruvian and Loreto, as well as in its control of the control of corruption.

Death 
He dies prematurely on 25 August 2008 at the age of 56, a victim of a painful cancer to the ganglia, with which he had for several months. The Regional Government of Loreto decreed regional duel throughout the territory of Loreto, and the Congress of the Republic raised the national flag at a duel signal.

External links
Official Congressional Site

1952 births
2008 deaths
Deaths from cancer in Peru
Deaths from lymphoma
Center Front politicians
Members of the Congress of the Republic of Peru

Popular Action (Peru) politicians
People from Loreto Region